U.S. Route 52 (US 52) is a  north–south U.S. Highway that travels from Charleston to the North Carolina state line near Cheraw. It serves as a strategic highway through the central part of the state. Though an even-numbered U.S. Highway, which are typically signed east–west, it is signed north–south in South Carolina. In some other states along its route, it is signed east–west. The South Carolina segment is signed such that US 52 north corresponds to the general westward direction of the highway, and vice versa.

Route description
US 52 begins at the intersection of Meeting and Line Streets, in Charleston. Going northwest along Meeting Street, it connects with I-26/US 17, followed by Morrison Drive (US 52 Spur hidden); US 52 signage begin to appear north of Morrison Drive.

From Moncks Corner, US 52 is briefly concurrent with US 17 Alt as it enters the Francis Marion National Forest and crosses the Dennis C. Bishop Bridge over the Tail Race Canal of the Cooper River just below Lake Moultrie.  The route traverses the Francis Marion National Forest as it continues northward to St. Stephen.  From there is proceeds to Kingstree and Lake City, before another short concurrency with US 301 from Effingham to Florence.  Through downtown Florence, it goes northwest and bypasses Darlington and joining another concurrency with US 401.

At Society Hill, it merges briefly with US 15 before continuing north again solo to Cheraw, where it overlaps briefly with US 1 and SC 9.  US 52 crosses the North Carolina state line, after traveling  through South Carolina, continuing on towards Wadesboro.

US 52 is a major highway between Charleston and Florence, all of which is four-lane or more with some sections signed .  North of Darlington, it becomes mostly a two-lane rural highway through the remainder of its route.  Though the majority of its routing and signage is north-south, some sections will also be signed east-west at various parts of the state.

Dedicated and memorial names
US 52 in South Carolina feature a few dedicated or memorialized stretches of freeway.

 Blue Star Memorial Highway – Official honorary name of US 52 in Berkeley County.  Markers are located in Moncks Corner, Pineville, and St. Stephen.
 L. Lawson Rhodes Highway – Is a dedicated section of US 52 located in Chesterfield County.  Dedicated in August, 2013, it is in honor of Patrolman L. Lawson Rhodes, who served as a trooper with the South Carolina Highway Patrol, who died on duty in 1938.

History
US 52 was established in 1935 as a renumbering of US 601 from the North Carolina state line to Florence and US 17 from Florence to Charleston.  In 1939, US 52 was rerouted into a concurrency with US 78 in North Charleston, leaving a section of Meeting Street.  Also in the same year, Cheraw to the North Carolina state line was the last section to be paved; while the first section of US 52 was widen to four-lane from Charleston to Durant Avenue, in North Charleston.

In 1940, US 52 was rerouted onto new alignment west of Lake City.  In 1948, US 52 was taken off King Street and placed on Meeting Street to Lee Street, in Charleston.  Around 1952-1969, US 52 was split during that period in Florence, with northbound along Irby Street and southbound along Coit Avenue; before and after it was solely on Irby Street.  Also around 1952, US 52 was bypassed west of Kingstree on new primary routing; the old route through town remained part of SC 261 while Academy Street, Kelly Street and Third Avenue were downgraded to secondary roads (all three SC-45-8).

In 1971, US 52 was moved onto new alignment south of Moncks Corner, leaving behind Old Highway 52 (S-8-791).  By 1973, US 52 was placed on new primary routing bypassing west around Darlington, leaving behind US 52 Bus.

Major intersections

See also

 Special routes of U.S. Route 52

References

External links

 
 US 52 at Virginia Highways' South Carolina Highways Annex

52
 South Carolina
Transportation in Charleston County, South Carolina
Transportation in Berkeley County, South Carolina
Transportation in Williamsburg County, South Carolina
Transportation in Florence County, South Carolina
Transportation in Darlington County, South Carolina
Transportation in Chesterfield County, South Carolina
Transportation in Charleston, South Carolina
Transportation in North Charleston, South Carolina
Goose Creek, South Carolina
Florence, South Carolina metropolitan area
Darlington, South Carolina